Arpeggi may refer to:
 the original name of the song "Weird Fishes/Arpeggi", by Radiohead
 Arpeggi, Inc., a bioinformatics startup company acquired by Gene by Gene in 2013
 the plural of arpeggio